Burin-Placentia West was a provincial electoral district for the House of Assembly of Newfoundland and Labrador, Canada. The district was known as Placentia West prior to 1975. As of 2011 there were 7,673 eligible voters living within the district.

Primarily a fishing district with the Marystown Shipyard and offshore fabrication yard an important part of the economy. Like many other districts, it has faced some tough economic times. Production has dropped at OCI's Marystown fish plant and work at the shipyard has been erratic.

The main communities are Marystown, Burin and Rushoon.

Other communities include Baine Harbour, Beau Bois, Boat Harbour, Brookside, Fox Cove-Mortier, Garnish Pond, Jean de Baie, Parker's Cove, Petite Fort, Port au Bras, Red Harbour, Red Island, Rock Harbour, South East Bight, and Spanish Room.

The district was abolished in 2015 into Placentia West-Bellevue and Burin-Grand Bank.

Members of the House of Assembly
The district has elected the following Members of the House of Assembly:

Election results

|-

|-

|-

|NDP
|Wayne Butler
|align="right"|684
|align="right"|10.91%
|align="right"|-35.79%
|}

|-

|-

|NDP
|Wayne Butler
|align="right"| 2658
|align="right"|40.83%
|align="right"|+40.83%
|-

|}

|-

|-

|}

References

External links
Website of the Newfoundland and Labrador House of Assembly

Newfoundland and Labrador provincial electoral districts